

Friedrich Pein (20 October 1915 – 14 February 1975) was an Austrian sniper in the Wehrmacht of  Nazi Germany during World War II, and one of two to have been awarded the Knight's Cross of the Iron Cross, the other being Matthäus Hetzenauer. 

Pein enlisted in the Wehrmacht in October 1938. His served as a sniper in the 143d Gebirgsjäger Regiment of the 6th Mountain Division on the Eastern Front. In early 1944, he was transferred to the 100th Jäger Division. On 28 February 1945 he was awarded the Knight's Cross of the Iron Cross marking his 200th kill as a sniper.

Awards

Knight's Cross of the Iron Cross on 28 February 1945 as Oberjäger and sniper in the 2./Jäger-Regiment 227

References

Citations

Bibliography

 

1915 births
1975 deaths
People from Radkersburg District
German military snipers
Austrian military personnel of World War II
Recipients of the Knight's Cross of the Iron Cross
German Army soldiers of World War II
Gebirgsjäger of World War II